Simone Sini (born 9 April 1992) is an Italian footballer who plays as a centre back for  club Alessandria.

Club career

Roma
Sini joined Lecce on a season-long loan deal with the option for Lecce to co-own the player at the end of the season for €1 million. Andrea Bertolacci also joined Lecce in similar deal. He made his Serie A debut on the first day of the 2010–11 season in a 4–0 drubbing away to Milan.

On 5 August 2011, he joined A.S. Bari on a long season loan deal that brought teammates Alessandro Crescenzi and Adrian Stoian to the team too. Bari also had option to co-own the player for €300,000. Sini extended the contract with Roma to 2014 as part of the loan. He earned €141,000 in gross for 2013–14 season (about €80,000 in net).

On 31 January 2012, Sini left for Livorno in another temporary deal, with an option to sign half of the "card" for €400,000. For the 2012–13 season, he moved on loan to Serie B team F.C. Pro Vercelli 1892 on 9 August 2012.

Virtus Entella
On 15 July 2015, Sini signed a two-year contract with Serie B club Virtus Entella.

Ascoli
On 24 September 2020, he moved to Ascoli on a 2-year contract.

Alessandria
On 27 January 2021, he signed with Alessandria. On 30 January 2022, he was loaned to Renate.

International career
Sini was a member of Italy national under-17 football team in 2009 UEFA European Under-17 Football Championship. He played all 3 matches in the qualification, 3 goals and a brace in elite qualification and 4 games and a goal in the final tournament. He played all 5 games in 2009 FIFA U-17 World Cup.

On 10 August 2011, he made his debut with the Italy U-21 team, in a friendly match against Switzerland.

References

External links
 
 Player Profile from legaseriea.it 
 National Team Stats from FIGC.it 
 

1992 births
Living people
People from Sesto San Giovanni
Association football defenders
Italian footballers
A.S. Roma players
U.S. Lecce players
S.S.C. Bari players
U.S. Livorno 1915 players
F.C. Pro Vercelli 1892 players
A.C. Perugia Calcio players
Pisa S.C. players
Virtus Entella players
U.S. Viterbese 1908 players
Ternana Calcio players
Ascoli Calcio 1898 F.C. players
U.S. Alessandria Calcio 1912 players
A.C. Renate players
Serie A players
Serie B players
Serie C players
Italy youth international footballers
Italy under-21 international footballers
Footballers from Lombardy
Sportspeople from the Metropolitan City of Milan